Alfred "Alf" John Francis (1846 – 1968) was a Welsh professional rugby league footballer who played in the 1900s and 1910s.

Playing career

International honours
Francis won 2 caps for Wales in 1913–1914 while at Hull, and toured with Great Britain on the 1914 Great Britain Lions tour of Australia and New Zealand.

Challenge Cup Final appearances
Francis played , i.e. number 5, and scored a try in Hull's 6–0 victory over Wakefield Trinity in the 1913–14 Challenge Cup Final during the 1913–14 season at Thrum Hall, Halifax, in front of a crowd of 19,000.

Club career
Hull Kingston Rovers first became aware of Francis when he scored a try in Treherbert RLFC's 10–22 defeat by Hull Kingston Rovers during the 1909–10 season, but he was thought by Hull Kingston Rovers to be too small, so they decided against signing him. An official of Hull Kingston Rovers then recommended him to the Hull F.C. chairman who travelled to Wales, decided that Francis' size wasn't an issue, and signed him for Hull F.C. for 75 gold sovereigns (based on increases in average earnings, this would be approximately £27,720 in 2016) Treherbert RLFC completed only 12-matches during the 1909–10 season, and as defaulters, they were prevented from playing in the 1910–11 season, by which time both Alfred Francis, and David Galloway had joined Hull FC.

Genealogical information
Alf Francis' marriage to Emma M. (née Baxter) took place at St. Matthew's Church, Boulevard, Hull, on 8 December 1915, and was registered during fourth ¼ 1915 in Hull district. They had children; Wellesley T. Francis (birth registered during fourth ¼ 1916 in Hull district) and Megan Francis (birth registered during first ¼ 1922 in Hull district).

References

External links
(archived by web.archive.org) Stats – Past Players – "F" at hullfc.com
(archived by web.archive.org) Statistics at hullfc.com
Search for "Alfred Francis" at britishnewspaperarchive.co.uk
Search for "Alf Francis" at britishnewspaperarchive.co.uk

Great Britain national rugby league team players
Hull F.C. players
Place of birth missing
Place of death missing
Rugby league wingers
Treherbert RLFC players
Wales national rugby league team players
Welsh rugby league players
Year of birth missing
Year of death missing